The members of the National Assembly of Czechoslovakia from 1920 to 1925 were elected in April 1920. Members of the Chamber of Deputies were elected on 18 April and members of the Senate on 25 April.

Chamber of Deputies

Senate

References